The Sherlock Building, also previously known as the Forbes and Breeden Building, is a building located in downtown Portland, Oregon, listed on the National Register of Historic Places.

In 2010, the Sherlock Building was purchased for $6.8 million by the Church of Scientology, with plans to turn it into the headquarters for its Portland chapter. The Church had previously purchased the nearby Stevens Building, but had decided that it would not be suitable without costly renovations.

Tenants
At the time of the building's purchase in 2010, Ruth's Chris Steak House was a tenant.

See also
 National Register of Historic Places listings in Southwest Portland, Oregon

References

External links
 

1893 establishments in Oregon
Commercial buildings completed in 1893
Commercial buildings on the National Register of Historic Places in Oregon
Frederick Manson White buildings
National Register of Historic Places in Portland, Oregon
Southwest Portland, Oregon
Portland Historic Landmarks